64 Squadron or 64th Squadron may refer to:

 No. 64 Squadron RAF, a unit of the United Kingdom Royal Air Force 
 64th Aggressor Squadron, a unit of the United States Air Force

See also
 64th Division (disambiguation)
 64th Regiment (disambiguation)